The Armutlu Peninsula is a peninsula extending westward into Marmara Sea in the Anatolian section of Turkey. In addition to Yalova Province, parts of Kocaeli Province and Bursa Province are on the peninsula.

Geography 
Armutlu Peninsula is between Gulf of Izmit in the north and Gulf of Gemlik in the south. The westernmost point of the peninsula is the cape of Bozburun. To the southeast of the peninsula, Lake İznik is situated.

The peninsula is actually a part of Samanlı Mountains, a mountain range lying between Bolu Mountains and Bozburun. The mountains are covered with forests.

Notable places 
Yalova, central city of the Yalova Province is at the northern coast. Most district centers of the province are in the coastal area of the peninsula. The peninsula is named after Armutlu district. Gölcük, a town in Kocaeli Province, best known for the Turkish Navy's main naval base with shipyard and the Ford Otosan automobile plant, is located at the northern gulf of the peninsula. Also on the northern coastline between Gölcük and Yalova, Karamürsel is located in Kocaeli Province. Historically, it was an important Ottoman naval base and during the Cold War era, the town hosted a United States naval air station, which operated a special antenna to intercept Soviet Union radio transmissions. West of Yalova, Çınarcık is located, a well-known seaside resort. 

Another notable location is Gemlik, a district of Bursa Province, situated at the peninsula's southern gulf. An important port city, it is renowned for its olives and olive oil.

The population density in the mountains at the inner peninsula is low, where there are only small villages.

Geology 
Both gulfs at the north and the south are actually on two active tectonic fault lines. The entire peninsula was hit by the İzmit earthquake on August 17, 1999, that occurred along the western portion of the North Anatolian Fault Zone.

References 

Peninsulas of Turkey
Landforms of Kocaeli Province
Landforms of Yalova Province
Landforms of Bursa Province
Marmara Region
Sea of Marmara